Sri Lanka is a tropical island situated close to the southern tip of India. The invertebrate fauna is as large as it is common to other regions of the world. There are about 2 million species of arthropods found in the world, and still it is counting. So many new species are discover up to this time also. So it is very complicated and difficult to summarize the exact number of species found within a certain region.

This a list of the coleopterans found from Sri Lanka, using recent family-level classification:

Beetle
Phylum: Arthropoda   Class: Insecta
Order: Coleoptera

Beetles are a group of insects that form the order Coleoptera. They have two pairs of wings, the front pair, the "elytra", being hardened and thickened into a shell-like protection for the rear pair and the beetle's abdomen. The order contains more species than any other order, constituting almost 25% of all known animal life-forms. About 40% of all described insect species are beetles (about 400,000 species), and new species are discovered frequently. The largest taxonomic family, the Curculionidae (the weevils or snout beetles), also belongs to this order.

The diversity of beetles is very wide-ranging. They are found in almost all types of habitats, but are not known to occur in the sea or in the polar regions. In Sri Lanka, particular beetle families are extensively studied, but some others not at all. Most of the studies beetles are due to the fact that they are pests for many cultivations. Numerous works had been done in the 1980s and 1990s by foreign scientists such as Arrow (1910-1931), Franz (1982), Hammond (1972), Hansen (1999), Chatterjee (1924) and Bonadona (1986). The knowledge by local investigators opened in the early 2000s and in 2003, Prof. Dangalle studies heavily on tiger beetles. Then in 2013, Dr. Qader et al. studies beetles in Western province to find their ecological niches and distribution. Weevils were studied by Prof. Gunawardena since 1993 and predatory Coccinellid beetles were studies by Dr. S Mayadunnage. In 2002, Poorani described the updated version of the annotated checklist of the Coccinellidae fauna of the Indian subcontinent, in which 83 species of ladybirds are listed from Sri Lanka. The members of subfamily Melolonthinae also been documented by Brinck, Anderson, and Cederholm. In 1979, Mohamed S. Mohamedsaid studied the taxonomy and distribution of the blister beetles of Sri Lanka. He described 7 genera with 15 species from the family Meloidae. In 2020, one rove beetle and four dung beetles were described from Salgala, Aranayake the Knuckles Range, and Alic Land Estate, Kegalle.

According to Channa Bambaradeniya et al., 3,033 species of coleopterans belongs to 115 families are recorded from Sri Lanka, which comprises the largest animal group in Sri Lanka.

Species count

Family: Aderidae - ant-like leaf beetles
Aderus concolor 
Aderus crassipes 
Aderus dikoyanus 
Aderus nigropictus 
Aderus orientalis 
Aderus scoparius 
Aderus taprobanus 
Euxylophilus principalis

Family: Anthicidae - Ant-like beetles
 
Amblyderus bigibber
Amblyderus brincki
Amblyderus thoracinus
Anthelephila anderssoni
Anthelephila besucheti
Anthelephila braminus
Anthelephila burckhardti
Anthelephila consul
Anthelephila insulana
Anthelephila opiatus
Anthicus semirubidus
Endomia besucheti 
Endomia castelsi 
Endomia ceylonica 
Laena formaneki
Leptaleus brincki
Mecynotarsus cederholmi
Mecynotarsus flinti
Notoxus brinckianus
Notoxus ravana
Phalantias besucheti
Phalantias loebli
Phalantias mussardi
Phalantias praeclarus
Pseudoleptaleus argutus
Pseudoleptaleus baloghi
Pseudoleptaleus basirufus
Pseudoleptaleus yalaensis
Pseudonotoxus cederholmi
Pseudonotoxus ekesi
Pseudonotoxus minutus
Sapintus barbei
Sapintus brincki
Sapintus capitatus
Sapintus flinti
Tomoderus anderssoni
Tomoderus discisus
Tomoderus mussardi
Tomoderus terrenus

Family: Anthribidae - Fungus weevils
 
Acorynus ceylonicus
Acorynus cinereomaculatus
Acorynus cingalus
Acorynus dohrni 
Acorynus labidus
Acorynus passerinus
Apolecta nietneri
Araecerus fragilis
Araecerus intangens
Araecerus irresolutus
Araecerus pardalis
Araecerus pumilus
Atinellia senex
Basitropis nitidicutis
Caccorhinus brunnipennis
Caccorhinus disconotatus
Contexta murina
Dendrotrogus colligens
Dendrotrogus hypocrita
Directarius bifoveatus
Disphaerona picta
Disphaerona punctata 
Disphaerona verrucosus
Exechesops horni
Exechesops molitor
Habrissus asellus
Habrissus tibialis
Hybosternus mesosternalis
Hypseus dilectus
Litocerus annulipes
Litocerus crucicollis
Litocerus semiustus
Mauia subnotata
Mecotropis bipunctatus
Mecotropis gardneri
Melanopsacus ceylonicus
Misthosima separ
Phaulimia caena
Phaulimia disticha
Phaulimia schaumi 
Phloeobius alternans
Phloeobius ceylonicus
Rhaphitropis tamilis
Straboscopus revocans
Straboscopus riehli
Sympaector angulifer
Tropideres verrucosus
Tropidobasis gemella
Ulorhinus distichus
Uncifer diffinis
Urodon maculatus
Urodon nigripes
Urodon tantillus
Xenocerus khasianus
Xenocerus mesosternalis
Xenocerus rectilineatus
Xylinada tamilanus 
Xylinada indigus
Zygaenodes horni
Zygaenodes molitor

Family: Attelabidae - Leaf-rolling weevils
 
Apoderus dohrni
Apoderus hystrix
Apoderus nietneri 
Apoderus pulchellus
Apoderus pullus
Apoderus scitulus
Apoderus tranquebaricus
Apoderus verrucosus
Asynaptops colombensis
Attelabus hystrix
Attelabus octospilotus
Attelabus tranquebaricus
Centrocorynus dohrni
Centrocorynus pulchellus
Euops metallica
Euops nietneri
Euops suffundens
Henicolabus octospilotus
Hoplapoderus echinatus
Hoplapoderus hystrix
Hoplapoderus nepalensis
Mechoris ursulus
Paracycnotrachelus nietneri
Strigapoderus ceylonicus

Family: Biphyllidae - False Skin beetles
Biphyllus minutus 
Diplocoelus indicus

Family: Bolboceratidae - Dor beetles
Bolbaffroides carenicollis
Bolboceras insulare
Bolbochromus laetus
Bolbochromus lineatus
Bolbohamatum meridionale

Family: Bostrichidae - Auger beetles
 
Amphicerus anobioides
Apate submedia
Bostrichus moderatus 
Bostrichus vertens 
Dinoderus ocellaris
Heterobostrychus aequalis
Heterobostrychus hamatipennis
Lichenophanes carinipennis 
Lyctus brunneus 
Lyctus discedens 
Lyctus disputans 
Lyctus retractus 
Lyctus retrahens 
Minthea rugicollis 
Paraxylion bifer 
Rhyzopertha dominica
Rhyzopertha sicula
Sinoxylon anale
Sinoxylon unidentatum
Xylocis tortilicornis
Xylodeleis obsipa
Xylophorus abnormis
Xylophorus ceylonicus
Xylopsocus capucinus
Xylothrips flavipes

Family: Bothrideridae - Cocoon-forming beetles
Ascetoderes bituberculatus
Dastarcus porosus
Leptoglyphus cristatus
Machlotes cognatus

Family: Brachyceridae - Tertiary-brachycerid weevils
 
Amblyrrhinus posticus
Desmidophorus caelatus
Desmidophorus communicans 
Desmidophorus discriminans
Desmidophorus fasciculicollis
Desmidophorus inexpertus
Desmidophorus obliquefasciatus 
Desmidophorus strenuus
Phytonomus ochraceus

Family: Brentidae - Straight-snouted weevils
Cerobates sumatranus
Cyphagogus westwoodii
Orychodes planicollis 
Trachelizus bisulcatus

Family: Buprestidae - Jewel beetles
 
Agrilus arenatus
Agrilus imitator
Agrilus immaculatellus
Agrilus immaculatus
Agrilus immaculicollis
Agrilus impar
Agrilus pidijinus 
Belionota aenea
Belionota sagittaria
Belionota sumptuosa
Chrysochroa fasciata
Sternocera chrysis
Trachys elvira
Trachys flaviceps

Family: Callirhipidae - Cedar beetle
Callirhipis fasciata

Family: Cantharidae - Soldier beetle
Caccodes extensicornis
Maltypus bibilensis
Maltypus kokagalaensis
Maltypus pidurutalagalanus
Microichthyurus sublateralis 
Microichthyurus sylvicola
Silis ekisi
Silis incisa

Family: Carabidae - Ground beetles
 
Abacetus antiquus
Abacetus atratus
Abacetus bipunctatus
Abacetus cordicollis
Abacetus dejeani
Abacetus flavipes
Abacetus guttula
Abacetus pallipes
Abacetus pomptus
Abacetus rufopiceus
Abacetus semimetallicus
Abacetus testaceipes
Abacidus atratus
Acupalpus derogatus
Acupalpus sinuellus
Agonum (Agonum) chinense
Agonum illocatum
Agonum japonicum
Amblystomus bivittatus
Amblystomus femoralis
Amblystomus fuscescens
Amblystomus guttatus
Amblystomus guttula
Amblystomus indicus
Amblystomus mandibularis
Amblystomus punctatus
Amblystomus quadriguttatus
Amblystomus stenolophoides
Amblystomus vulneratus
Anaulacus adelioides
Anaulacus fasciatus - ssp. fasciatus
Anaulacus opaculus
Anaulacus pleuronectes
Anchista brunnea
Anomotachys acaroides
Anomotarus decoratus
Anomotarus stigmula
Anthracus anamensis
Anthracus horni
Apotomus atripennis
Apristus cupreus
Apristus subtransparens
Arame macra
Archicolliuris bimaculata - ssp. bimaculata
Archicolliuris immaculata
Ardistomopsis myrmex
Ardistomopsis ovicollis
Argiloborus amblygonus
Argiloborus ceylanicus
Argiloborus curtus
Argiloborus monticola
Argiloborus stricticollis
Arrowina pygmaea
Arrowina taprobanae
Batoscelis oblonga
Bembidion foveolatum
Bembidion opulentum - ssp. opulentum
Brachinus immaculicornis - ssp. immaculicornis
Brachinus limbellus
Brachinus pictus
Brachinus sexmaculatus
Brachinus tetracolon
Brachyodes subolivaceus
Brachyodes virens
Bradybaenus festivus
Caelostomus picipes
Caelostomus sculptipennis
Calleida splendidula
Callistomimus littoralis - ssp. ceylonicus
Callistomimus pernix
Callytron limosum
Catascopus cingalensis
Catascopus whithillii
Cerapterus latipes
Chlaeminus biguttatus
Chlaenius bengalensis
Chlaenius bioculatus
Chlaenius circumdatus - ssp. circumdatus
Chlaenius cyanostolus
Chlaenius fastigatus
Chlaenius fletcheri
Chlaenius hamifer
Chlaenius henryi
Chlaenius inops
Chlaenius kerkvoordeae
Chlaenius laetiusculus
Chlaenius laetus
Chlaenius lafertei
Chlaenius leucops
Chlaenius macropus
Chlaenius malachinus
Chlaenius nepalensis
Chlaenius nigricans
Chlaenius oodioides
Chlaenius orbicollis
Chlaenius parallelus
Chlaenius pretiosus
Chlaenius pulcher
Chlaenius punctatostriatus
Chlaenius ruficauda
Chlaenius rufifemoratus
Chlaenius rugulosus
Chlaenius scapularis
Chlaenius tetragonoderus - ssp. tetragonoderus
Chlaenius trachys
Chlaenius velocipes
Chlaenius xanthospilus
Cicindela aurulenta - ssp. juxtata
Cicindela bicolor - ssp. haemorrhoidalis, xanthospilota
Cicindela calligramma
Cicindela cardoni
Cicindela ceylonensis
Cicindela discrepans
Cicindela diversa
Cicindela fischeri - ssp. fischeri
Cicindela flavomaculata - ssp. flavomaculata
Cicindela lacrymans
Cicindela ocellata
Cicindela separata
Cicindela severa
Cicindela sylvicola
Clivina castanea
Clivina elongatula
Clivina forcipata
Clivina mustela
Clivina obenbergeri
Clivina striata
Clivina tranquebarica
Clivina westwoodi
Clypeuspinus validus 
Coleolissus iris
Collyris dohrnii - ssp. dohrnii
Colpodes bipars
Colpodes fletcheri
Colpodes iteratus
Colpodes repletus
Colpodes retusus
Colpodes sebosus
Colpodes xenos
Coptodera chaudoiri - ssp. chaudoiri
Coptodera eluta
Coptodera interrupta
Coptolobus anodon
Coptolobus ater
Coptolobus glabriculus
Coptolobus latus
Coptolobus lucens
Coptolobus omodon
Coryza maculata
Craspedophorus angulatus
Craspedophorus bifasciatus
Craspedophorus elegans
Craspedophorus halyi
Craspedophorus microspilotus
Creagris labrosa
Crepidogaster ceylanica
Crepidogaster horni
Cyclosomus flexuosus
Cylindera dormeri
Cylindera ganglbaueri
Cylindera henryi
Cylindera labioaenea - ssp. labioaenea
Cylindera lacunosa
Cylindera nietneri
Cylindera paradoxa
Cylindera singalensis
Cylindera waterhousei
Cylindera willeyi
Cymindoidea munda
Derocrania agnes
Derocrania concinna
Derocrania flavicornis
Derocrania fusiformis
Derocrania glabiceps
GleneDerocrania halyi
Derocrania intricatorugulosa
Derocrania jaechi
Derocrania nematodes
Derocrania nietneri
Derocrania shaumi
Derocrania scitiscabra
Desera geniculata
Dicaelindus impunctatus
Diceromerus orientalis
Dicranoncus cinctipennis
Dicranoncus queenslandicus
Dicranoncus ravus
Dioryche chinnada
Dioryche colombensis
Dioryche sericea
Dioryche torta - ssp. torta
Diplocheila daldorfi
Diplocheila laevis
Diplocheila polita
Dischissus notulatus
Distichus mahratta
Distichus picicornis
Distichus puncticollis
Distichus uncinatus
Dolichoctis chitra
Dolichoctis goniodera
Dolichoctis marginifer
Dolichoctis strita - ssp. striata
Dolichoctis vitticollis
Dromius orthogonioides
Drypta lineola - ssp. lineola
Drypta mastersii
Dyschirius bengalensis
Dyschirius mahratta
Dyschirius ordinatus
Dyschirius paucipunctus
Elaphropus amabilis - ssp. orantus
Elaphropus amplians
Elaphropus arcuatus
Elaphropus ceylanicus
Elaphropus charis
Elaphropus decoratus
Elaphropus diabrachys
Elaphropus eueides
Elaphropus finitimus
Elaphropus granarius
Elaphropus horni
Elaphropus interpunctatus
Elaphropus klugii
Elaphropus latus
Elaphropus nalandae
Elaphropus nilgiricus
Elaphropus notaphoides
Elaphropus occultus
Elaphropus ovatus
Elaphropus peryphinus
Elaphropus politus - ssp. politus
Elaphropus rubescens
Elaphropus suturalis
Endynomena pradieri
Eucolliuris fuscipennis
Euplynes marginatus
Euschizomerus denticollis
Eustra ceylanica
Gnaphon costatus
Gnathaphanus vulneripennis
Gnopheroides pearsoni
Harpaglossus opacus
Helluodes taprobanae
Heteropaussus taprobanensis
Holcocoleus melanopus
Holcoderus fissus
Holcoderus praemorsus
Hololeius ceylanicus
Hypaetha biramosa - sp. biramosa
Hypaetha quadrilineata
Hyphaereon consors
Hyphaereon hornianus
Hyphaereon maculatus
Hyphaereon vittatus
Idiomorphus guerini
Jansenia cirrhidia
Jansenia corticata
Jansenia laeticolor
Jansenia stellata
Jansenia westermanni
Lachnothorax biguttatus
Lasiocera coromandelica
Lebia dichroma
Lebia exsanguis
Lebia leucaspis
Lebia lunigera
Lebia monostigma
Leleuporella sexangulata
Lionychus albivittis
Lionychus horni
Lophyra cancellata
Lophyra catena - ssp. catena, insularis
Lorostema alutacea - ssp. alutacea, spinipennis
Loxocrepis ruficeps
Loxoncus discophorus
Loxoncus microgonus
Loxoncus nagpurensis
Loxoncus renitens
Loxoncus schmidti
Macrocheilus bensoni
Macrocheilus niger
Masoreus orientalis
Mastax euanthes
Mastax histrio
Melaenus piger
Melanospilus andrewesi
Metacolpodes buchannani
Metazuphium spinangulis
Microlestes demessus - ssp. demessus
Microlestes inconspicuus
Microlestes xanthopus
Mimocolliuris pilifera
Mimocolliuris stigma
Miscelus javanus
Miscelus unicolor
Mochtherus tetraspilotus
Morion cucujoides
Morion orientalis
Myriochila distinguenda
Myriochila fastidiosa - ssp. fastidiosa
Myriochila undulata
Nanodiodes piceus
Nanodiodes westermanni
Neocollyris aenea
Neocollyris ceylonica
Neocollyris crassicornis - ssp. crassicornis
Neocollyris planifrontoides
Neocollyris plicaticollis
Neocollyris punctatella
Neocollyris saundersii - ssp. laetior, saundersii
Neocollyris sedlaceki
Neocollyris tuberculata
Neocollyris vedda
Nototachys comptus
Omphra hirta
Omphra pilosa
Omphra rufipes
Oodes angustatus
Oodes bivittatus
Oodes taprobanae
Oodes xanthochilus
Ooidius advolans
Oosoma gyllenhalii
Oosoma semivittatum
Ophionea ceylonica
Ophionea indica
Ophionea interstitialis
Ophionea nigrofasciata - ssp. nigrofasciata
Ophoniscus insulicola
Ophoniscus iridulus
Orthogonius acutangulus
Orthogonius batesi
Orthogonius femoralis
Orthogonius fugax
Orthogonius longicornis
Orthogonius ovatulus
Orthogonius parallelus
Orthogonius planiger
Orthogonius schaumi
Orthogonius srilankaicus
Oxylobus lateralis - ssp. designans
Oxylobus ovalipennis
Oxylobus porcatus
Paradromius steno
Paraphaea binotata
Parena nigrolineata
Parophonus compositus
Parophonus cyaneotinctus
Parophonus javanus
Parophonus lividus
Parophonus nagpurensis - ssp. curvatus
Paussus desneuxi
Paussus escherichi
Paussus fletcheri
Paussus horni
Paussus pacificus
Paussus politus
Peliocypas catenatus
Peliocypas euproctoides
Peliocypas fuscus
Peliocypas intermedius
Peliocypas levipennis
Peliocypas malleus
Peliocypas oryctus
Peliocypas repandus
Peliocypas trigonus
Pelocharis remyi
Pentagonica ceylonica
Pentagonica erichsoni
Pentagonica horni
Pentagonica pallipes
Pentagonica ruficeps
Pentagonica ruficollis
Pentagonica venusta
Perigona castanea
Perigona nigriceps
Perigona nigricollis
Perigona nigrifrons
Perigona plagiata
Perigona sinuaticollis
Perigona tronqueti
Perileptus ceylanicus
Perileptus indicus
Peripristus ater
Pheropsophus bimaculatus
Pheropsophus catoirei
Pheropsophus chaudoiri
Pheropsophus discicollis
Pheropsophus lissoderus
Pheropsophus occipitalis
Pheropsophus picicollis
Physocrotaphus ceylonicus
Physodera eschscholtzii
Planetes bimaculatus
Planetes elegans
Planetes ruficeps
Planetes ruficollis
Planetes simplex
Platymetopus flavilabris
Platymetopus keiseri
Platymetopus pictus
Platymetopus rugosus
Platytarus boysii
Prothyma proxima
Protocollyris planifrons
Pseudoclivina memnonia
Pseudognathaphanus dispellens
Pseudognathaphanus punctilabris
Pseudognathaphanus rusticus
Pterostichus atratus
Scarites ceylonicus
Scarites indus
Scarites selene
Selina westermanni
Sericoda ceylonica
Siagona depressa - ssp. depressa
Siagona fabricii
Siagona plana
Somotrichus unifasciatus
Stenolophus opaculus
Stenolophus pallipes
Stenolophus polygenus
Stenolophus quinquepustulatus
Stenolophus rectifrons
Stenolophus smaragdulus
Stomonaxellus ceylanensis
Styphlomerus fusciceps
Syleter porphyreus
Syleter validus
Syntomus quadripunctatus
Tachys brachys
Tachys euryodes
Tachys fasciatus - ssp. faciatus
Tachys impressipennis
Tachys incertus
Tachys opalescens
Tachys quadrillum
Tachys sexguttatus
Tachys tropicus
Tachys truncatus
Tachys umbrosa
Tantillus brunneus
Tantillus vittatus
Tetragonoderus cursor
Tetragonoderus fimbriatus
Tetragonoderus notaphioides
Tetragonoderus quadrinotatus
Trichotichnus hiekei
Trichotichnus lamprus
Trichotichnus lucens
Trichotichnus marginalis
Trichotichnus nitens
Trichotichnus pseudolucens
Tricondyla coriacea
Tricondyla femorata
Tricondyla granulifera
Tricondyla nigripalpis
Trigonotoma indica
Trilophidius impunctatus
Trilophus arcuatus
Xenodochus mediocris
Zuphium dabreui
Zuphium erebeum
Zuphium olens

Family: Cerambycidae - Longhorn beetles
 
Acalolepta griseoplagiata
Acalolepta nivosa
Acalolepta rusticatrix
Acanthophorus serraticornis
Aeolesthes holosericea
Aeolesthes induta
Amimes macilentus
Anomophysis confusa
Anomophysis crenata
Anomophysis plagiata
Anomophysis spinosa
Anoplophora beryllina
Apomecyna ceylonica
Atimura dentipes
Atimura proxima
Bandar pascoei
Baralipton dohrni
Batocera davidis
Batocera numitor
Batocera rufomaculata
Blepephaeus blairi
Bostrychopsebium usurpator
Callichromopsis telephoroides
Callimetopoides albomaculatus
Calothyrza sehestedtii
Cantharocnemis downesii
Cantharocnemis durantoni
Capnolymma cingalensis
Celosterna scabrator
Centrotoclytus quadridens
Ceresium elongatum
Ceresium flavipes
Ceresium gracile
Ceresium longicorne
Ceresium nilgiriense
Ceresium rotundicolle
Ceresium zeylanicum
Ceylanoglaucytes kratzii
Ceylanoglaucytes moesta
Ceylanoparmena loebli
Ceylanosybra baloghi
Chelidonium argentatum
Chinobrium vesculum
Chloridolum trogoninum
Chlorophorus abruptulus
Chlorophorus annularis
Chlorophorus cingalensis
Chlorophorus melancholicus
Chlorophorus moestus
Chlorophorus sagittarius
Cleonaria cingalensis
Clytus ceylonicus
Coptops aedificator
Cyrtonops aterrima
Demonax ascendens
Demonax decorus
Demonax divisus
Demonax olemehli
Demonax walkeri
Dere apicaloides
Dialeges undulatus
Diorthus cinereus
Dorysthenes rostratus
Dubianella chrysogaster
Dymasius macilentus
Dymasius minor
Dymasius turgidulus
Egesina aspera
Egesina ceylonensis
Egesina sericans
Epania cingalensis
Epepeotes commixtus
Eucomatocera vittata
Eunidia ceylanica
Eunidia discovittata
Eunidia mehli
Eunidia opima
Exocentrus aculeatus
Exocentrus ceylanicus
Exocentrus exocentroides
Exocentrus ficicola
Exocentrus fortifer
Exocentrus mehli
Exocentrus pellitus
Exocentrus pubescens
Exocentrus sparsutus
Falsomesosella ceylonica
Gelonaetha hirta
Glenea arithmetica
Glenea cancellata
Glenea ceylonica
Glenea commissa
Glenea duodecimplagiata
Glenea quadrimaculata
Glenea scapifera
Glenea socia
Gnatholea simplex
Gyaritus indicus
Halme cinctella
Haplopsebium kolibaci
Homalomelas gracilipes
Homalomelas quadridentatus
Homalomelas zonatus
Inermoparmena besucheti
Leptepania filiformis
Macrochenus tigrinus
Massicus venustus
Megopis terminalis
Merionoeda taprobanica
Mesosa columba
Mesosa indica
Mesosa rosa
Micropraonetha carinipennis
Mimepilysta compacta
Mimosciadella fuscosignata
Mispila albosignata
Moechohecyra verrucicollis
Moechotypa ceylonica
Molorchus taprobanicus
Mulciber strandi
Neocerambyx opulentus
Neoplocaederus consocius
Neoplocaederus ferrugineus
Neoplocaederus obesus
Neosybra ropicoides
Nepiodes terminalis
Niphona malaccensis
Notomulciber bryanti
Notomulciber strandi
Nupserha ceylonica
Nupserha vexator
Nyphasia torrida
Oberea ceylonica
Oberea kanarensis
Oberea kandyana
Oberea lutea
Obereopsis flaveola
Olenecamptus bilobus
Pachylocerus crassicornis
Pachyteria calumniata
Pachyteria fasciata
Paradihammus ceylonicus
Paradystus ceylonicus
Paraleprodera crucifera
Paramimistena duplicata
Paranandra ceylonica
Parorsidis ceylanica
Pentheopraonetha latifrons
Perissus myops
Perissus parvulus
Pharsalia patrona
Pharsalia proxima
Phelipara moringae
Polyzonus tetraspilotus
Pothyne ceylonensis
Prionomma atratum
Pseudaristobia octofasciculata
Pseudocalamobius ceylonensis
Pseudocentruropsis flavosignata
Pterolophia bigibbera
Pterolophia ceylonensis
Pterolophia ceylonica
Pterolophia convexa
Pterolophia dohrni
Pterolophia fusca
Pterolophia incerta
Pterolophia insulicola
Pterolophia parovalis
Pterolophia tuberculatrix
Purpuricenus sanguinolentus
Rhaphipodus taprobanicus
Rhaphuma elegantula
Rhaphuma teres
Ropica ceylonica
Ropica signata
Scalenus singalensis
Sciades ceylanicus
Sebasmia templetoni
Sebasmia testacea
Serixia ceylonica
Serixia histrio
Serixia proxima
Setoparmena mussardi
Similosodus venosus
Sophronica ceylanica
Spinimegopis cingalensis
Spinimegopis morettoi
Spinopraonetha fuscomaculata
Stenhomalus lateralis
Stenhomalus y-pallidum
Sthenias maculiceps
Stromatium barbatum
Sybra albisparsa
Sybra apomecynoides
Sybra citrina
Sybra fuscosuturalis
Sybra oblongipennis
Sybra praeusta
Sybra pseudosignata
Sybra quadrimaculata
Sybra signatoides
Tetraglenes ceylonensis
Tetraommatus filiformis
Tetraommatus muticus
Therippia affinis
Therippia decorata
Therippia mediofasciata
Therippia signata
Therippia triloba
Thranius gibbosus
Tricholophia ceylonica
Xoanodera amoena
Xylorhiza adusta
Xylotrechus carenifrons
Xylotrechus carinifrons
Xylotrechus subscutellatus
Xystrocera globosa
Yimnashana ceylonica
Zonopteroides diversus
Zonopterus redemanni
Zoodes eburioides
Zoodes maculatus
Zotalemimon procerum

Family: Cerylonidae - Minute bark beetles
Axiocerylon brincki
Cerylon gracilipes 
Cerylon quadricolle 
Cerylon tibiale 
Cerylon unicolor 
Ectomicrus aper
Ectomicrus setosus
Metaxestus bicolor
Monotoma longicollis
Murmidius bifasciatus
Neolapethus orientalis

Family: Chrysomelidae - Leaf beetles
 
Agonita apicipennis
Amblispa dohrnii
Amblispa laevigata
Anisodera guerini
Aspidimorpha dorsata
Aspidimorpha furcata 
Aspidimorpha lobata 
Aspidolopha melanophthalma 
Brontispa longissima
Bruchidius anderssoni
Bruchidius brincki
Bruchidius cingalicus
Bruchidius mendosus
Bruchidius nalandus
Callispa brevipes
Callispa fulvonigra
Callispa krishnashunda
Callispa minima
Callispa nigricornis
Callispa nigritarsata
Callispa pita
Callosobruchus bicalcaratus
Callosobruchus chinensis
Callosobruchus gibbicollis
Callosobruchus nigripennis
Caryedon serratus
Cassida ceylonica
Cassida circumdata
Cassida cognobilis
Cassida dorsonotata
Cassida imbecilla
Cassida obtusata
Chiridopsis bipunctata
Chiridopsis marginata
Crioceris hampsoni
Dactylispa albopilosa
Dactylispa ceylonica
Dactylispa feae
Dactylispa fulvipes
Dactylispa haeckelii
Dactylispa horni
Dactylispa insignita
Dactylispa lankaja
Dactylispa tissa
Decellebruchus walkeri
Dicladispa arebiana
Downesia ceylonica
Epistictina reicheana
Epitrix lomasa
Estigmena chinensis
Eutornus jansoni
Galerucella placida 
Gonophora nigricauda 
Hispa andrewesi 
Hispa ramosa
Hispellinus minor
Hispellinus perotetii
Laccoptera quatuordecimnotata
Leptispa latifrons
Leptispa pygmaea
Leptispa samkirna
Lilioceris foveipennis
Lilioceris impressa
Longitarsus allotrophus
Longitarsus angelikae
Medythia suturalis
Micrispa zinzibaris
Monolepta cognata
Monolepta descripta
Monolepta juno 
Monolepta oculata
Monolepta sexlineata
Notosacantha vicaria
Oncocephala quadrilobata
Phola octodecimguttata 
Platycorynus peregrinus
Platypria echidna 
Platypria erinaceus 
Platypria hystrix 
Promecotheca cumingii 
Rhodtrispa dilaticornis 
Sagra femorata 
Sceloenopla octopunctata
Silana farinosa 
Spermophagus aeneipennis
Spermophagus albosparsus
Spermophagus cederholmi 
Spermophagus mannarensis
Spermophagus niger
Spermophagus perpastus
Spermophagus pfaffenbergeri

Family: Ciidae - Minute tree-fungus beetles
Cis contendens 
Cis coriarius 
Xylographus ceylonicus 
Xylographus ritsemai

Family: Clambidae - Fringe-winged beetles
Acalyptomerus asiaticus
Clambus ceylonicus
Clambus pumilus 
Clambus villosus

Family: Cleridae - Checkered beetles
Stigmatium ceramboides
Stigmatium gemmatus
Tilloidea notata

Family: Coccinellidae - Lady beetles

Afidenta misera
Afidentula bisquadripunctata
Anegleis cardoni
Aspidimerus nigrovittatus
Axinoscymnus puttarudriahi
Brumoides lineatus
Brumoides suturalis
Brumus ceylonicus
Cheilomenes sexmaculata
Cheilomenes transversalis
Chilocorus circumdatus
Chilocorus nigritus
Chilocorus subindicus
Clitostethus fumatus
Coccinella septempunctata
Coelophora inaequalis
Coelophora minki
Cryptogonus bryanti
Cryptogonus orbiculus
Empia vittata
Epilachna decemmaculata
Epilachna delessertii
Epilachna dumerili
Epilachna flavicollis
Epilachna hendecaspilota
Epilachna zeylanica
Harmonia octomaculata
Henosepilachna quinta
Henosepilachna septima
Henosepilachna vigintioctopunctata
Horniolus dispar
Illeis bistigmosa
Illeis cincta
Jauravia albidula
Jauravia kapuri
Jauravia limbata
Jauravia opaca
Jauravia pallidula
Jauravia pilosula
Jauravia pubescens
Jauravia simplex
Jauravia soror
Megalocaria dilatata
Micraspis discolor
Microserangium laterale
Nephus patruus
Novius amabilis
Novius breviuscula
Novius cardinalis
Novius octoguttata
Novius vestita
Ortalia horni
Ortalia kandyana
Ortalia minuta
Pharoscymnus suturalis
Platynaspis flavoguttata
Propylea dissecta
Propylea luteopustulata
Pseudaspidimerus flaviceps
Pseudaspidimerus mauliki
Pseudaspidimerus trinotatus
Pseudaspidimerus uttami
Scymnus albopilis
Scymnus apiciflavus
Scymnus ceylonicus
Scymnus coccivora
Scymnus fuscatus
Scymnus gratiosus
Scymnus hilaris
Scymnus latemaculatus
Scymnus lepidulus
Scymnus musculus
Scymnus nubilus
Scymnus quadrillum
Scymnus saciformis
Scymnus victoris
Sticholotis horni
Sticholotis rufoplagiata
Sticholotis sanguinolenta
Synona obscura
Synonycha grandis
Telsimia ceylonica
Telsimia rotundata

Family: Cucujidae - Flat bark beetles
 
Aulonosoma tenebrioides 
Cryptolestes divaricatus
Cryptolestes ferrugineus
Cryptolestes klapperichi 
Laemophloeus atratulus
Laemophloeus coloratus
Laemophloeus foveolatus
Laemophloeus hypocrita
Laemophloeus incertus
Laemophloeus insinuans
Narthecius bicolor
Narthecius truncatipennis
Notolaemus lewisi 
Passandra uniformis 
Placonotus orientalis
Placonotus subtestaceus
Placonotus torsus 
Xylolestes krombeini
Xylolestes laevior

Family: Curculionidae - True weevils and bark beetles
 
Acacacis zeylanicus
Acicnemis dorsonotata
Acicnemis horni
Acicnemis mansueta
Acicnemis reversa
Aclees birmanus
Alcidodes comptus
Alcidodes erosus
Alcidodes fornicatus
Alcidodes lugubris
Alcidodes magnificus
Alcidodes notabilis
Alcidodes texatus
Alcidodes virgatus
Amasa doliaris
Ambrosiodmus asperatus
Amphialus agrestis
Amphialus communicans
Amphialus descriminans
Amphialus turgidus
Amphorygma ceylonensis
Arixyleborus granulifer
Arixyleborus malayensis
Arixyleborus mediosectus
Arixyleborus rugosipes
Astycus aequalis
Astycus apicatus
Astycus armatipes
Astycus bilineatus
Astycus canus
Astycus cinereus
Astycus cinnamomeus
Astycus horni
Astycus immunis
Astycus lewisi
Astycus suturalis
Atinella senex
Balaninus c-album
Blosyrus inaequalis
Camptorrhinus reversa
Cleonus arenarius
Cleonus gyllenhali
Cleonus ophinotus
Cleonus zebra
Cnestus gravidus
Cnestus magnus
Cnestus mutilatus
Coccotrypes advena
Coccotrypes cyperi
Coccotrypes flavicornis
Coccotrypes rugicollis
Coccotrypes theae
Coccotrypes variabilis
Coccotrypes vulgaris
Coptodryas tenella
Cosmopolites sordidus
Cossonus disciferus
Cossonus divisus
Cossonus hebes
Cossonus horni
Craniodicticus mucronatus
Cratopus sinhalensis
Crossotarsus minor
Crossotarsus saundersi
Cryphalogenes euphorbiae
Cryphalogenes exiguus
Cryphalomorphus opacus
Cryphalops capucinus
Cryphalops quadridens
Cryphalus fuliginosus
Cryphalus neglectus
Cryphalus nigricans
Cryphalus palawanus
Cryphalus subvestitus
Cryphalus tetricus
Cryphalus vestitus
Cryptorhynchus assimilans
Cryptorhynchus declaratus
Curculio arenarius
Curculio c-album
Curculio curvicornis
Curculio dentifer
Curculio lineolatus
Curculio lugubris
Curculio motschulskyi
Curculio rufimanus
Cyrtotrachelus rufopectinipes
Dacryophthorus brincki
Debus emarginatus
Dendroctonomorphus muricatus
Dereodus mastos
Dereodus sparsus
Desmidophorinus fasciculicollis
Diamerus curvifer
Diocalandra subfasciatus
Diuncus haberkorni
Dryocoetes taprobanus
Dryophthorus setulosus
Eccoptopterus spinosus
Epicalus virgatus
Episomus figuratus
Episomus fimbriatus
Episomus pyriformis
Euwallacea bicolor
Euwallacea dilatatiformis
Euwallacea fornicatior
Euwallacea fornicatus
Euwallacea interjectus
Euwallacea perbrevis
Euwallacea piceus
Euwallacea similis
Exilis horni
Ficicis despectus
Genyocerus albipennis
Hyledius regalis
Hylurgus concinnulus
Hypoborus ficus
Hypocryphalus cylindripennis
Hypocryphalus glabratus
Hypocryphalus interponens
Hypocryphalus mangiferae
Hypothenemus areccae
Hypothenemus bicinctus
Hypothenemus eruditus
Hypothenemus externedentatus
Hypothenemus seriatus
Ischnopus taprobanus
Liparthrum brincki
Macrorhyncolus crassitarsis
Mechistocerus assimilans
Mechistocerus declaratus
Megarrhinus cingalensis
Mesites subvittatus
Mesites suturalis
Myllocerus angulatipes
Myllocerus canescens
Myllocerus curvicornis
Myllocerus delicatulus
Myllocerus dentifer
Myllocerus discolor
Myllocerus equinus
Myllocerus fringilla
Myllocerus retratiens
Myllocerus subfasciatus
Myllocerus transmarinus
Myllocerus undatus
Myllocerus undecimpustulatus
Myllocerus variegatus
Myllocerus viridanus
Myllocerus zeylanicus
Myocalandra exarata
Nassophasis foveata
Nassophasis pictipes
Neodiamerus granulicollis
Niphades vexatus
Odoiporus longicollis
Odontobarus hodiernus
Omotemnus introducens
Omphasus nalandae
Orthosinus salutarius
Orthosinus velatus
Otidognathus meridionalis
Oxydema fusiforme
Peltotrachelus ovis
Pentarthrum wollastoni
Pentoxydema rostralis
Phaenomerus sundevalli
Phloeoditica curtus
Phloeophagosoma atratum
Phloeophagosoma morio
Phloeophagus cossonoides
Phloeosinus detersus
Phloeotrogus obliquecaudata
Phrygena ephippiata
Piazomias aequalis
Piazomias immunis
Platypus furcatus
Platypus latifinis
Platypus rotundicauda
Platyrrhinus marmoratus
Platytrachelus ovis
Polytus mellerborgi
Prodioctes haematicus
Prodioctes singhalensis
Psilosomus hebes
Ptilopodius ceylonicus
Ptochus imbricatus
Ptochus limbatus
Ptochus planoculis
Ptochus pyriformis
Rhabdocnemis maculata
Rhinoncus paganus
Rhynchaenus c-album
Rhynchophorus ferrugineus
Rhynchophorus introducens
Rhyncolus ater
Rhyncolus cossonoides
Rhyncolus linearis
Rhyncolus taciturnus
Scolytomimus dilutus
Scolytomimus mimusopis
Scolytomimus rectus
Sipalinus gigas
Sipalus hypocrita
Sipalus porosus
Sitona ambiguus
Sitophilus exarata
Sitophilus mellerborgi
Sitophilus subfasciatus
Sphaerotrypes cristatus
Sphaerotrypes ranasinghei
Sphenophorus maculata
Sphenophorus planipennis
Sphenophorus sordidus
Stereotribus incisus
Stereotribus tuberculifrons
Strattis biguttatus
Strattis srilankaiensis
Strattis vestigialis
Strophosomus suturalis
Sueus niisimai
Sympiezomias kraatzi
Tanymecus curviscapus
Treptoplatypus solidus
Trigonocolus cingalensis
Trochorhopalus discifer
Trochorhopalus leucogrammus
Tylodes semicollis
Webbia ceylonae
Xerodermus porcellus
Xyleborinus andrewesi
Xyleborinus exiguus
Xyleborus affinis
Xyleborus costipennis
Xyleborus cristatuloides
Xyleborus cuneolosus
Xyleborus dilatatiformis
Xyleborus figuratus
Xyleborus insitivus
Xyleborus perforans
Xyleborus pseudocitri
Xyleborus rimulosus
Xyleborus seminitens
Xylosandrus arquatus
Xylosandrus compactus
Xylosandrus crassiusculus
Xylosandrus discolor
Xylosandrus mancus
Xylosandrus morigerus
Xylosandrus pygmaeus

Family: Dermestidae - Skin beetles
Anthrenus ceylonicus
Anthrenus oceanicus 
Attagenus undulatus 
Evorinea hirtella 
Orphinus fulvipes 
Orphinus funestus 
Orphinus guernei 
Orphinus minor 
Orphinus tabitha 
Thaumaglossa pici 
Thaumaglossa tonkinea 
Trinodes cinereohirtus 
Trinodes emarginatus
Trogoderma granarium

Family: Discolomatidae 
Aphanocephalus lewisi 
Aphanocephalus pellitus 
Aphanocephalus rufinus 
Aphanocephalus saundersi 
Parafallia simoni

Family: Dryopidae - Long-toed water beetles
Ceradryops punctatus
Elmomorphus naviculus 
Helichus naviculus

Family: Dytiscidae - Predaceous diving beetles
 
Clypeodytes bufo
Clypeodytes dilutus
Copelatus ceylonicus
Copelatus freudei 
Copelatus irinus
Copelatus mahleri
Copelatus mysorensis
Copelatus neelumae
Copelatus schereri
Copelatus taprobanicus
Copelatus tenebrosus
Cybister cardoni
Cybister confusus
Cybister dejeanii
Cybister extenuans
Cybister javanus
Cybister prolixus
Cybister sugillatus
Cybister tripunctatus 
Cybister ventralis
Eretes sticticus
Herophydrus musicus 
Hydaticus fabricii
Hydaticus fractifer
Hydaticus incertus
Hydaticus luczonicus 
Hydaticus pacificus
Hydaticus ricinus 
Hydaticus satoi 
Hydaticus vittatus 
Hydroglyphus flammulatus
Hydroglyphus flaviculus
Hydroglyphus inconstans  
Hydrovatus acuminatus 
Hydrovatus bonvouloiri 
Hydrovatus castaneus 
Hydrovatus confertus 
Hydrovatus ischyrus
Hydrovatus obtusus
Hydrovatus picipennis
Hydrovatus rufoniger
Hydrovatus seminarius
Hydrovatus sinister
Hydrovatus subrotundatus
Hydrovatus subtilis
Hyphoporus interpulsus
Hyphoporus nilghiricus
Hyphoporus pugnator
Hyphydrus intermixtus
Hyphydrus lyratus
Hyphydrus renardi
Lacconectus simoni
Lacconectus spangleri 
Laccophilus anticatus
Laccophilus ceylonicus
Laccophilus ellipticus
Laccophilus flexuosus
Laccophilus guttalis
Laccophilus inefficiens 
Laccophilus parvulus
Laccophilus sharpi
Laccophilus uniformis
Laccophilus wolfei
Leiodytes griseoguttatus
Microdytes maculatus
Neptosternus ceylonicus 
Neptosternus sinharajaicus
Neptosternus starmuehlneri
Neptosternus taprobanicus
Pseuduvarus vitticollis
Rhantus interclusus
Rhantus taprobanicus
Sandracottus festivus
Sandracottus jaechi
Uvarus livens

Family: Elateridae - Click beetles
 
Adelocera fulvicollis
Aeoloderma brachmana
Anchastus humeralis
Calais speciosus 
Cardiotarsus vulneratus 
Ceropectus cederholmi
Ceylanidrillus kandyanus 
Conoderus collaris 
Conoderus pruinosus 
Cryptalaus sordidus
Dicronychus stolatus
Drapetes subula 
Drasterius sulcatulus 
Elius dilatatus
Lanelater fuscipes 
Lanelater robustus 
Lanelater sobrinus
Lissomus mastrucatus 
Melanotus cribriventris
Melanotus fuscus
Melanotus punctosus
Melanotus walkeri
Meristhus ceylonensis 
Mulsanteus hirtellus
Negastrius anderssoni
Negastrius brincki 
Paracardiophorus fuscipennis
Parallelostethus macassariensis 
Priopus vafer
Quasimus tomentosus
Rismethus diodesmoides
Rismethus minusculus
Selasia apicalis
Selasia isabellae
Silesis becvari
Silesis insularis
Xanthopenthes ceylonensis
Zorochros misellus
Zorochros titanus

Family: Elmidae - Riffle beetles
 
Aesobia pygmea
Ancyronyx jaechi
Cephalolimnius ater 
Graphelmis ceylonica
Ilamelmis brunnescens 
Ilamelmis crassa
Ilamelmis foveicollis
Ilamelmis starmuhlneri 
Ilamelmis cederholmi
Ohiya carinata 
Ordobrevia flavolineata 
Ordobrevia fletcheri
Podelmis aenea
Podelmis ater 
Podelmis cruzei 
Podelmis graphica 
Podelmis humeralis 
Podelmis metallica
Podelmis ovalis 
Podelmis quadriplagiata
Podelmis similis 
Podelmis viridiaenea
Potamophilinus costatus 
Potamophilinus impressicollis
Potamophilinus torrenticola
Stenelmis anderssoni
Stenelmis brincki
Taprobanelmis carinata
Unguisaeta rubrica
Zaitzeviaria bicolor
Zaitzeviaria elongata
Zaitzeviaria zeylanica

Family: Endomychidae - Handsome fungus beetles
 
Ancylopus ceylonicus
Bystodes angustus 
Bystodes felix 
Bystodes lugubris 
Chondria minima 
Cyclotoma cingalensis 
Endocoelus laticollis
Endocoelus minor
Endocoelus orbicularis
Eumorphus quadriguttatus - ssp. quadriguttatus, pulchripes 
Idiophyes ceylonica
Idiophyes eumetopus
Indalmus lachrymosus
Loeblia ceylanica
Loeblia nigra
Mycetina castanea
Ohtaius annularis 
Ohtaius lunulatus 
Saula ferruginea
Saula nigripes
Stenotarsus castaneus 
Stenotarsus nietneri 
Stenotarsus russatus 
Stenotarsus sicarius 
Stenotarsus tomentosus 
Stenotarsus vallatus 
Stictomela chrysomeloides 
Stictomela inflate 
Stictomela opulenta 
Trochoideus desjardinsi

Family: Erotylidae - Pleasing fungus beetles
Microlanguria jansoni

Family: Eucinetidae - Plate-thigh beetles
Eucinetus tamil

Family: Gyrinidae - Whirligig beetles
 
Aulonogyrus obliquus
Gyrinus convexiusculus
Gyrinus sericeolimbatus
Orectochilus dilatatus
Orectochilus discifer
Orectochilus fraternus
Orectochilus indicus
Orectochilus wehnckei
Porrorhynchus indicans

Family: Heteroceridae - Variegated mud-loving beetles
Augyles feai
Augyles ivojenisi
Augyles sublinearis
Heterocerus cinctus
Heterocerus maindroni

Family: Histeridae - Clown beetles
 
Acritus copricola
Acritus tuberisternus
Atholus coelestis
Atholus daldorffi
Bacanius ambiguus
Chaetabraeus granosus
Chaetabraeus orientalis
Chaetabraeus paria
Chalcionellus pulchellus
Cypturus aenescens
Epiechinus taprobanae
Halacritus alutiger
Hister javanicus
Hister trigonifrons
Hololepta elongata
Liopygus minutus
Liopygus subsuturalis
Nasaltus chinensis
Nasaltus orientalis
Pachylister lutarius
Pachylister scaevola
Platylister desinens
Platylomalus biarculus
Platylomalus oceanitis
Tribalus colombius
Trypeticus bombacis

Family: Hybosoridae - Scavenger scarab beetles
 
Besuchetostes besucheti
Besuchetostes loebli
Besuchetostes mussardi
Besuchetostes peradeniyae
Besuchetostes taprobanae
Hybosorus orientalis
Phaeochrous compactus
Phaeochrous elevatus
Phaeochrous emarginatus
Pterorthochaetes haroldi

Family: Hydrophilidae - Water scavenger beetles
 
Berosus pulchellus
Berosus undatus
Cercyon connivens
Cercyon lineolatus
Cercyon nigriceps
Cercyon subsolanus
Chasmogenus abnormalis
Coelostoma stultum
Coelostoma vitalisi
Dactylosternum abdominale
Enochrus esuriens
Helochares mundus
Hydrophilus bilineatus - ssp. caschmirensis
Paroosternum sorex
Pelthydrus jengi
Pelthydrus suffarcinatus
Regimbartia attenuata
Sphaeridium quinquemaculatum
Sternolophus inconspicuus
Sternolophus rufipes

Family: Hydroscaphidae - Skiff beetles
Hydroscapha jaechi 
Hydroscapha monticola

Family: Jacobsoniidae - Jacobson's beetles
Derolathrus ceylonicus

Family: Lampyridae - Fireflies
Asymmetricata humeralis
Abscondita chinensis
Abscondita promelaena
Baolacus ruficeps
Ceylanidrillus basimaculatus
Ceylanidrillus kandyanus
Gorhamia krombeini
Harmatelia bilinea
Hyperstoma marginata
Hyperstoma wittmeri
Luciola antennalis 
Luciola candezei
Luciola intricata
Luciola nicollieri
Stenocladius horni

Family: Latridiidae - Minute brown scavenger beetles
Besuchetia ceylanica
Cartodere lobli
Derolathrus ceylonicus 
Melanophthalma ceylanica

Family: Limnichidae - Minute mud beetles
Byrrhinus cribrosus 
Byrrhinus latus 
Pelochares gibbipennis 
Pelochares orientalis 
Pelochares rugiventrus 
Pelochares sulciger

Family: Lucanidae - Stag beetles
 
Aegus chelifer - ssp. kandiensis, chelifer
Calcodes carinatus
Calcodes cingalensis
Dinonigidius bartolozzii
Dinonigidius ahenobarbus
Dorcus bennigseni
Dorcus henryi
Figulus aratus
Figulus horni
Figulus interruptus
Figulus nitens
Neolucanus sinicus - ssp. championi
Odontolabis cingalensis
Platyfigulus scorpio
Prosopocoilus henryi
Serrognathus gypaetus

Family: Lycidae - Net-winged beetles
 
Atelius acutecornis
Cautires ceylonicus 
Cautires krombeini 
Ditoneces hirsutus 
Ditoneces hispidus 
Falsotrichalus lankaensis
Lyropaeus ceylonicus 
Lyropaeus tamil
Melaneros bicoloratus
Melaneros inermis
Melaneros kejvali
Melaneros oculeus
Melaneros uzeli
Plateros aliquantulus
Plateros arcuatus 
Plateros bidentatus 
Plateros firmus 
Plateros flexuosus 
Plateros kandiensis
Plateros kleinei 
Plateros lanceolatus 
Plateros leechi
Plateros nigrostriatus
Plateros persubtilis 
Plateros portentificus
Plateros pseudodispellens
Plateros reconditus 
Plateros reflexus 
Plateros tenuis 
Plateros uncus
Plateros vagatus 
Plateros viduus
Plateros volatus
Xylobanus minusculus 
Xylobanus villosus

Family: Lymexylidae - Ship-timber beetles
Atractocerus emarginatus

Family: Meloidae - Blister beetles
 
Eletica testacea
Epicauta haematocephala
Horia debyi
Horia fabriciana
Hycleus balteata
Hycleus phaleratus
Hycleus rouxi
Mylabris alternata
Mylabris ceylonica
Mylabris orientalis
Mylabris plagiata
Mylabris pustulata
Mylabris recognita
Mylabris thunbergi
Sybaris nigrifinis
Sybaris praeustus
Sybaris testaceus
Sybaris yakkala
Zonitoschema krombeini

Family: Monotomidae - Root-eating beetles
Monotoma longicollis
Monotomopsis andrewesi

Family: Mordellidae - Pintail beetles
Falsomordellistena konoi 
Hoshihananomia composita 
Mordella defectiva 
Mordellistena flaviceps 
Mordellistena rufotestacea
Mordellistena trimaculata

Family: Murmidiidae 
Murmidius lankanus

Family: Mycetophagidae - Hairy fungus beetles
Berginus maindroni 
Litargus taprobanoe

Family: Mycteridae - Palm and flower beetles
Grammatodera bifasciata

Family: Nitidulidae - Sap beetles
Brassicogethes aeneus
Cyllodes bifascies
Stelidota multiguttata

Family: Nosodendridae - Wounded-tree beetles
Nosodendron ceylanicum

Family: Noteridae - Burrowing water beetles
Canthydrus luctuosus

Family: Oedemeridae - False blister beetles
Dryopomera ceylonica

Family: Omethidae - False soldier beetles
Drilonius ceylanicus 
Drilonius keiseri 
Drilonius testaceicollis

Family: Passalidae - Bess beetles
 
Aceraius comptoni
Aceraius laevicollis
Episphenus comptoni
Episphenus flachi
Episphenus moorei
Leptaulax bicolor
Macrolinus cartereti
Macrolinus crenatipennis
Macrolinus obesus
Macrolinus rotundifrons
Macrolinus waterhousei
Stephanocephalus redtenbacheri
Taeniocerus bicanthatus

Family: Prostomidae - Jugular-horned beetles
Dryocora simoni 
Prostomis schlegeli

Family: Psephenidae - Water-penny beetles
Eubrianax ceylonicus 
Eubrianax lioneli 
Macroeubria ceylonica
Odontanax flinti

Family: Pterogeniidae 
Pterogenius besucheti

Family: Ptiliidae - Feather-wing beetles
Acrotrichis discoloroides
Acrotrichis orientalis

Family: Ptilodactylidae
Ptilodactyla apicicornis 
Ptilodactyla humeralis

Family: Ptinidae - Spider beetles
Myrmecoptinus subsuturalis
Ptinus brevithorax
Ptinus lemoldes
Ptinus nigerrimus

Family: Rhynchitidae - Tooth-nosed snout weevils
 
Arodepus marginellus
Auletobius subgranulatus
Auletobius testaceipennis
Caenorhinus fuscipennis
Caenorhinus marginatus
Caenorhinus rufipallens
Cartorhynchites flavipedestris
Elautobius horni
Epirhynchites giganteus
Eugnamptobius flavipes
Maculinvolvulus vestitoides
Maculorhinus fasciatus
Metarhynchites nalandaicus
Metarhynchites parvulus
Parinvolvulus ceylonensis
Pseudodeporaus ceylonensis
Pseudomesauletes ceylonicus
Pseudomesauletes gallensis
Pseudomesauletes maculatus
Synaptops suffundens
Thompsonirhinus amictus
Thompsonirhinus ceylonensis
Thompsonirhinus clavatus
Thompsonirhinus restituens

Family: Salpingidae - Narrow-waisted bark beetles
Elacatis ceylanicus 
Elacatis lyncca 
Lissodema ceylonicum 
Lissodema lewisi 
Ocholissa bicolor
Rhinosimus ceylonicus

Family: Scarabaeidae - Scarab beetles
 
Agestrata orichalca - ssp. nigrita
Alissonotum piceum
Anthracophora crucifera
Caccobius aterrimus
Caccobius diminutivus
Caccobius indicus
Caccobius meridionalis
Caccobius rufipennis
Caccobius unicornis
Caccobius vulcanus
Campsiura nigripennis - ssp. cingalensis
Catharsius capucinus
Catharsius granulatus
Catharsius molossus
Catharsius pithecius
Chaetadoretus infans
Chaetadoretus lasiopygyus
Chaetadoretus mus
Chaetadoretus rugosus
Chaetadoretus silonicus
Chaetadoretus singhalensis
Chiron cylindrus
Cleptocaccobius durantoni
Cleptocaccobius inermis
Clinteria ceylonensis
Clinteria chloronota
Clinteria coerulea - ssp. megaspilota
Clinteria imperialis
Clinteria jansoni
Clinteria keiseri
Clinteria klugi - ssp. rufipennis
Clinteria pantherina
Clyster itys
Coenochilus taprobanicus
Copris fricator
Copris repertus
Copris signatus
Copris sodalis
Dasyvalgus addendus
Delopleurus parvus
Dicheros bimacula
Digitonthophagus bonasus
Digitonthophagus gazella
Dipelicus bidens
Dipelicus daedalus
Dipelicus hircus
Eophileurus cingalensis - ssp. decatenatus
Euselates scenica
Gametis versicolor
Garreta smaragdifer
Glycosia tricolor
Glycyphana horsfieldi - ssp. aurulenta
Gymnopleurus cyaneus
Gymnopleurus gemmatus
Gymnopleurus koenigi
Gymnopleurus miliaris
Gymnopleurus parvus
Gymnopleurus sericeifrons
Haroldius herrenorum
Haroldius krali
Heliocopris ares
Heliocopris bucephalus
Heteronychus krombeini
Heterorrhina elegans
Liatongus rhadamistus
Maladera cervicornis
Maladera galdaththana
Neoserica dharmapriyai
Neosisyphus tarantula
Ochicanthon ceylonicus
Ochicanthon cingalensis
Onitis crenatus
Onitis philemon
Onitis singhalensis
Onitis subopacus
Onthophagus capitosus
Onthophagus centricornis
Onthophagus cervus
Onthophagus ceylonicus
Onthophagus cryptogenus
Onthophagus dama
Onthophagus falsus
Onthophagus favrei
Onthophagus fissicornis
Onthophagus frontalis
Onthophagus fuscopunctatus
Onthophagus gemma
Onthophagus gravis
Onthophagus hastifer
Onthophagus heterorrhinus
Onthophagus hystrix
Onthophagus keiseri
Onthophagus laevigatus
Onthophagus ludio
Onthophagus luridipennis
Onthophagus martialis
Onthophagus militaris
Onthophagus modestus
Onthophagus negligens
Onthophagus occipitalis
Onthophagus ochreatus
Onthophagus oculatus
Onthophagus parvulus
Onthophagus politus
Onthophagus pusillus
Onthophagus pygmaeus
Onthophagus quadridentatus
Onthophagus rectecornutus
Onthophagus rufulgens
Onthophagus regalis
Onthophagus solmani
Onthophagus sparsepunctatus
Onthophagus spinifex
Onthophagus taprobanus
Onthophagus tritinctus
Onthophagus turbatus
Onthophagus unifasciatus
Onthophagus vacca
Oreoderus insularis
Orphnus parvus
Oryctes gnu
Oryctes rhinoceros
Oxycetonia versicolor
Panelus ceylonicus
Panelus fallax
Panelus horni
Panelus imitator
Panelus pernitidus
Panelus puncticollis
Panelus rufocuprea
Panelus setosus
Panelus whitehousei
Panelus wiebesi
Paragymnopleurus melanarius
Phaedotrogus ceylonicus
Phalops divisus
Phyllognathus dionysius
Proagoderus pactolus
Protaetia alboguttata
Protaetia aurichalcea
Protaetia ceylanica
Protaetia cupripes - ssp. germar
Scarabaeus erichsoni
Scarabaeus gangeticus
Scarabaeus sanctus
Selaserica athukoralai
Sisyphus crispatus - ssp. hirtus
Sisyphus indicus
Sisyphus longipes
Spilophorus cretosus
Taeniodera flavomaculata
Taeniodera halyi
Taeniodera quadrivittata
Thaumastopeus ceylonicus
Tibiodrepanus hircus
Tibiodrepanus setosus
Xylotrupes gideon - ssp. socrates
Xylotrupes meridionalis
Xylotrupes taprobanes

Subfamily: Aphodiinae - Aphodiine dung beetles
 
Aganocrossus amoenus
Aganocrossus pallidicornis
Alocoderus elongatulus
Ammoecioides spectabilis - ssp. tricarinulatus
Aphodius humilis
Aphodius insularis
Aphodius lewisi
Aphodius urostigma
Ataenius ceylonensis
Calamosternus granarius
Chaetopisthes singalensis
Labarrus hoabinhensis
Leiopsammodius indicus 
Liothorax kraatzi
Mesontoplatys rufolaterus
Neocalaphodius moestus
Neotrichiorhyssemus hegeri
Paradidactylia biseriatus
Paradidactylia haafi
Paradidactylia ovatulus
Paradidactylia wichei
Phalacronothus carinulatus
Phalacronothus ceylonensis
Pharaphodius crenatus
Pharaphodius robustus
Pharaphodius lewisi
Pharaphodius ratnapurensis 
Pleurophorus cracens
Psammodius tesari
Rhyssemus granulosus
Rhyssemus indicus
Rhyssemus inscitus
Rhyssemus loebli
Saprosites dynastoides
Saprosites loebli
Saprosites sulciceps
Sybax impressicollis
Trichaphodius moorei
Trichiorhyssemus fruhstorferi

Subfamily: Melolonthinae - White grubs
 
Apogonia aequabilis
Apogonia blanchardi
Apogonia cava
Apogonia comosa
Apogonia coriacea
Apogonia expeditonis
Apogonia ferruginea
Apogonia fulvosetosa
Apogonia gracilis
Apogonia laevissima
Apogonia lateralis
Apogonia lurida
Apogonia nana
Apogonia nietneri
Apogonia prolixa
Apogonia rauca
Apogonia solida
Autoserica dubia
Autoserica pubescens
Autoserica srilanka
Brahmina flavipennis
Dichelomorpha glabrilinea
Dichelomorpha punctuligera
Engertia maculosa
Holotrichia ceylonensis
Holotrichia convexifrons
Holotrichia danielssoni
Holotrichia disparilis
Holotrichia eurystoma
Holotrichia furcifer
Holotrichia inducta
Holotrichia kandulawai
Holotrichia opuana
Holotrichia parva
Holotrichia remorata
Holotrichia reynaudi
Holotrichia rufoflava
Holotrichia schmitzi
Holotrichia semitomentosa
Holotrichia serrata
Holotrichia setosa
Idiochelyna pectoralis
Lepidiota ferruginosa
Leucopholis horni
Leucopholis pinguis
Maladera breviata
Maladera calcarata
Maladera cardoni
Maladera chalybaea
Maladera cinnaberina
Maladera coxalis
Maladera fistulosa
Maladera immunita
Maladera implicata
Maladera insanabilis
Maladera rotunda
Maladera rufocuprea
Maladera setosa
Maladera singhalensis
Maladera straba
Maladera weligamana
Neoserica bombycina
Neoserica sexfoliata
Neoserica splendifica
Periserica fracta
Periserica nigripennis
Periserica picta
Rhizotrogus aequalis
Rhizotrogus hirtipectus
Rhizotrogus sulcifer
Schizonycha ruficollis
Schizonycha singhalensis
Selaserica nitida
Selaserica pusilla
Selaserica scutellaris
Selaserica sericea
Serica distincticornis
Serica fusa
Serica hamifera
Serica interrupta
Serica lurida
Serica maculicauda
Serica maculifera
Serica nana
Serica nepalensis
Serica rubescens
Serica semicincta
Serica ventriosa
Sophrops costatus
Sophrops eurystomus
Sophrops singhalensis
Stephanopholis cribricollis
Stephanopholis rubicundus
Stephanopholis singhalensis

Subfamily: Rutelinae - Shining Flower Chafers
 
Adoretus bicaudatus
Adoretus celogaster
Adoretus chloronota
Adoretus conformis
Adoretus corpulentus
Adoretus discalis
Adoretus discors
Adoretus duplicatus
Adoretus dussumieri
Adoretus erythrocephalus
Adoretus feminalis
Adoretus fracta
Adoretus gravida
Adoretus illusa
Adoretus infantilis
Adoretus leo
Adoretus pellucida
Adoretus procrastinator
Adoretus ruficapilla
Adoretus sorex
Adoretus superflua
Adoretus suturalis
Adoretus varicolor
Adoretus versutus
Adoretus viridis
Adoretus walkeri
Callistethus bugnioni
Callistethus chloromelus
Callistethus princeps
Lepadoretus compressus
Lepadoretus ermineus
Lepadoretus mavis
Lepadoretus nietneri
Micranomala cingalensis
Mimela macleayana
Mimela mundissima
Parastasia basalis
Parastasia cingala
Parastasia lobata
Popillia discalis
Rhamphadoretus sorex
Rhinyptia gilleti
Rhinyptia meridionalis
Singhala hindu
Singhala tenella
Trogonostomus ursus

Family: Scirtidae - Marsh beetles
Cyphon besucheti 
Cyphon pseudoatratus

Family: Scraptiidae - False flower beetles
Scraptia cingalensis 
Scraptia compressicollis 
Scraptia flavidula 
Scraptia fuscipennis 
Scraptia indica 
Scraptia setipes 
Scraptia xylophiloides

Family: Scydmaenidae - Ant-like stone beetles
Euconnus intrusus
Scydmaenus conicollis

Family: Silphidae - Carrion beetles
Diamesus osculans 
Necrophila rufithorax

Family: Silvanidae - Silvan flat bark beetles
 
Lyctus brunneus
Monanus concinnulus
Monanus horni
Monanus rugosus
Oryzaephilus acuminatus
Oryzaephilus genalis
Oryzaephilus mercator
Oryzaephilus surinamensis
Parahyliota serricollis
Protosilvanus granosus
Psammoecus delicatus
Psammoecus elegans
Psammoecus felix
Psammoecus gentilis
Psammoecus simoni
Psammoecus trimaculatus
Silvanolomus denticollis
Silvanoprus cephalotes
Silvanoprus distinguendus
Silvanoprus longicollis
Silvanoprus porrectus
Silvanus difficilis
Silvanus imitatus
Silvanus lewisi
Silvanus recticollis

Family: Staphylinidae - Rove beetles
 
Anotylus exiguus
Anotylus glareosus
Anotylus hybridus
Anotylus insecatus
Anotylus latiusculus
Anotylus tetracarinatus
Baeocera longicornis
Batribolbus palpator
Batrisiella satoi
Carpelimus fuliginosus
Cilea limbifer
Clidicus minilankanus 
Erymus gracilis
Oligota parva
Oxytelopsis pseudopsina
Oxytelus bengalensis
Oxytelus incisus
Oxytelus lividus
Oxytelus migrator
Oxytelus nigriceps
Oxytelus puncticeps
Oxytelus varipennis
Scaphisoma stictum
Scopaeus testaceus
Stenus bicornis
Stenus cordatus
Stenus melanarius
Stenus serupeus
Stenus solutus

Family: Tenebrionidae - Darkling beetles
 
Alphitobius laevigatus
Amarygmus picicornis
Ceropria induta
Corticeus cephalotes
Eutochia aptera
Falsandrosus tetrops
Gonocephalum depressum
Laena formaneki
Leichenum canaliculatum
Oedemutes tumidus
Pimelia undulata
Platydemoides brincki
Sternocera chrysis
Tribolium castaneum
Uloma bituberosa
Uloma polita
Ulomimus indicus
Ulomina carinata

Family: Trictenotomidae - Croc beetles
Trictenotoma templetoni

Family: Trogidae - Hide beetles
Omorgus (Afromorgus) frater
Omorgus (Afromorgus) granulatus
Omorgus (Afromorgus) inclusus
Omorgus (Afromorgus) inermis
Omorgus (Afromorgus) maissouri

Family: Vesperidae - Vesperid longicorn beetles
Doesus taprobanicus

Family: Zopheridae - Ironclad beetles

Bitoma siviana
Cebia rugosa
Microprius rufulus
Monomma brunneum
Nematidium elongatum
Trachypholis hispidum

Notes

References

Sri Lanka
Sri Lanka

Coleopterans